Ysanne Spevack (born 24 June 1972) is a British-American Jewish composer, conductor and arranger who plays violin, viola and cello, and assorted multi-instruments including mbira, keyboards and guitar. best known for her work recording and touring with the Smashing Pumpkins, David J, Michael Stipe, Tiesto, Elton John, Christina Perri, Hawkwind, Psychic TV, and Asian Dub Foundation. In 2018 she announced that her name has changed to Meena Ysanne.

She has a dual career as a food writer. Her thirteen cookbooks have been published by HarperCollins and other book publishers internationally, and have led to her writing about food for the Los Angeles Times and other leading media outlets internationally.

She was based in Los Angeles from 2004-2015, where she shaped a career arranging strings and playing acoustic and electric violin, and composing original music for soundtracks, notably for two feature films: To Be Friends  and The Owls. Her performance and arranging work for film, TV and multiple recording artists touches upon several genres, including orchestral, rock music, pop music, world music, and film scores.

In 2014, she started designing multisensory, multimedia immersive experiences in New York based on her music compositions, food concepts, and emerging ideas from neuroscience and psychology. She did this leading a team of artists and scientists from many disciplines for each event. In May 2017, she presented a TEDx Talk  about this work in Bend, Oregon.

She is based between New York, London, Austin TX, and Los Angeles.

Biography

Early life
Ysanne was raised in London, where she studied piano, violin and guitar. Her great uncle, Edward Summers, was a professional violinist who played for silent movies, and her cousin is classical violinist Geoffrey Trabichoff, formerly leader of the BBC Scottish Symphony Orchestra. She began touring Europe aged 13, playing classical repertoire including Mozart, Vivaldi and Haydn.

After studying composition and conducting with violin at The Royal College of Music, London, and then later CuBase and Music Technology at Community Music, with teachers Aniruddha Das and Steve Chandra Savale, she traveled to India, studying classical Indian music and sitar in the city of Varanasi. In 1995, Ysanne began to play electric violin with electronics for many producers and DJs in the underground Acid House, Techno and Drum and Bass music scenes of London, notably with Sister Bliss from Faithless, Tiesto, Talvin Singh, T Power and Tsuyoshi Suzuki.

Rock, Pop and Soundtrack Composing Career
Ysanne began her recording career in 1996 by recording and releasing her first studio album, under the moniker Mee. Even in this first work, she relies heavily on Extended technique while playing an acoustic violin made from aluminum alloy. In 1997 she began collaborating with Philip Clemo and released the album Sound – Inhale the Colours with him. Later that year on 25 June, she played electric violin with Laurie Anderson at the Queen Elizabeth Hall as part of the South Bank Meltdown Festival.

In 1999 she recorded another album with Philip Clemo, Soundzero, which was not released until 2008. The same year she participated to various neofolk compilations, notably The Pact ...Of the Gods (Fremdheit), Torture Garden – Bizarre & Eccentric (Torture Garden Records), and the split single with Death in June We Said Destroy as part of the band Fire + Ice. She also produced the music on the album Time Dragons, a spoken word album.

In 2001, she composed soundtracks for the Discovery Channel's Lonely Planet travel series. In 2003, Ysanne was invited to perform electric violin for Peter Sellars at the Venice Biennale. This led her to being invited to arrange strings and record electric violin for a new work for the English National Opera. She moved to America the year after.

In 2008, she played violin, viola and electric violin for visual artist Doug Aitken's work sleepwalkers. The film featured Tilda Swinton, Donald Sutherland and Cat Power, and premiered at MoMA in New York.

In 2009, Ysanne recorded the track Salahadeen with the Master Musicians of Joujouka, David J and Dub Gabriel. The same year she was also the string contractor for Ray Bradbury's 'Chrysalis' and toured with David J.

In 2010 she directed the music and sang live at the Frankfurt Museum of Modern Art for visual performance artist Vanessa Beecroft's work VB68. It was the 68th work where Beecroft arranged nude women as art, but the 1st work where any of the women have made a noise of any kind. The performance lasted for two hours, with Ysanne singing and vocalising Beecroft's manifesto. The same year she composed the soundtracks to two full-length feature films: To Be Friends for brothers Jim and Aaron Eckhart, and The Owls for Cheryl Dunye and her strings were commissioned for HBO's Big Love. She also played strings on the Smashing Pumpkins Teargarden by Kaleidyscope EP series that featured Billy Corgan, Kerry Brown and Linda Strawberry.

In September 2011, Ysanne joined David J and Ego Plum to play music for the Los Angeles stage production of The Chanteuse and the Devil's Muse, and in November 2011, she joined David for the Los Angeles stage production of Silver for Gold and the Redcat Theater. David J played bass guitar on her new album, Coldwater, which was released in 2013.

In 2013, Ysanne's song and film, The Mermaid Song, sold 24,000 copies, released in collaboration with Sea Shepherd Conservation Society and LUSH (company), as featured in the Los Angeles Times and internationally.

In 2016, Ysanne created a multisensory performance with music, food, technology, video and other modalities, as featured in The Huffington Post and widely reported internationally. She was interviewed about this for Future Human from Nokia Bell Labs

In 2017, she presented a TED Talk about creating multi-sensory, multidisciplinary work that is Crossmodal. She also wrote orchestral arrangements and recordings that were released on the Psychic TV album, Fishscales Falling.

She primarily composes soundtracks for film, commercials, and documentaries, including her original music for ads for Vans, Chanel, and Mars.

Food Writing Career
Ysanne has a dual career as a cookbook author and food writer. Her first cookbook, Organic Cookbook, was published in 1996. She has continued to write cookbooks during the many spaces in the musical creative day, for example on the back of tour buses. As such, she has had thirteen cookbooks published including Fresh & Wild - A Real Food Adventure which was commissioned by Whole Foods Market and published by HarperCollins in 2003. In 2015, Rizzoli Bookstore published a cookbook she co-wrote The Ranch at Live Oak Cookbook and the book was praised by The New York Times and Vogue, Harper's Bazaar  alongside other leading press.

In September 2018, her cookbook Vegetable Cakes was published by Lorenz Books.

In addition, she has managed edible estates for William Shatner, Patrick Dempsey and Angela Lindvall and cooked for members of the entertainment and wellness community, including Joshua Bell and Sharon Salzberg.

Sensory Experience Design Career
Since 2014, Ysanne has combined her knowledge of music and food by creating immersive experiences based on emerging crossmodal scientific understanding of how the sense perceptions are inter-related and integrated.

In September 2016, Ysanne's multisensory experiences were praised in Yahoo! News, Huffington Post, and The Express Tribune.

Discography
Ysanne has produced music under her birth name, and under the aliases Meena Ysanne, Mee, and Soror U.

 Mee, 1997', credited to Mee (Mee Music)
 Sound – Inhale the colours, 1997, credited to Mee and Philip Clemo (Mee Music)
 Time Dragons: Poems, Pathworkings and Pataphysical Patter, 1999, from the box set The Chaos Magick Audio CDs Volume 5 – The Galafron Rite & Timedragons, An Astral Working of Illumination, credited to Dave Lee, Soror U and Dr. Natan Satan and edited by Peter J. Carroll (Falcon Press)
 The Sound of Fashion, 2004, credited to Ysanne Spevack and Carl Ryden (Standard Music)
 Soundzero, 2008, credited to Ysanne Spevack and Philip Clemo (Koch / Cadiz)
 The Mermaid Song, 2013, credited to Ysanne (LUSH Cosmetics / Sea Shepherd Conservation Society)

Incomplete bibliography

References

External links
Official site
The Los Angeles Times, 2013
Yahoo News, 2016
The Huffington Post, 2016
Interview in Inhabit Magazine, 2016
Interview in Cool Hunting, 2016
Music for Good
Consequence of Sound
Singapore Today
The Express Tribune
Bridge instruments artist profile
All About Jazz magazine
Wallpaper magazine
LA Weekly
The Guardian
The New York Times
Vogue
TEDx Talk

British violinists
British composers
1972 births
Living people
21st-century British conductors (music)
21st-century violinists